Sir De Villiers Graaff, 2nd Baronet,  (8 December 1913 – 4 October 1999) (first name De Villiers, surname Graaff) known as Div Graaff, was a South African politician who succeeded his father, Sir David Pieter de Villiers Graaff, 1st Baronet, to his baronetcy in 1931. He died in 1999 and was succeeded by his son, Sir David de Villiers Graaff, 3rd Baronet.  He was the leader of the centrist United Party which was the official opposition in the then all-white South African Parliament from 1956 to 1977.

Early life
Graaff was born on 8 December 1913 in Cape Town, Western Cape. He attended Western Province Preparatory School and served as head boy during his final year at the school.

Graaff succeeded his father as baronet in 1931. This baronetcy is one of twelve conferred on South Africans between 1841 and 1924.

He studied law at the Universities of Cape Town, Leiden, and Oxford.  In 1937, he returned to South Africa and was admitted as an advocate in the South African Supreme Court.

At the outbreak of World War II, Graaff joined the Union Defence Force. He served in North Africa and was taken prisoner of war by Axis forces during the Siege of Tobruk. He spent the rest of the war transitioning between German and Italian prison camps and was later appointed a Member of the Order of the British Empire (MBE) in 1946 for his relief efforts among prisoners.

His youngest brother was Johannes de Villiers Graaff, a noted South African welfare economist.

Political career
Graaff became a member of the House of Assembly, the lower house of Parliament, in 1948, the year his United Party was ousted from government by the conservative National Party, which promised to enact a de jure system of apartheid. Victory in De Villiers' constituency (Hottentots-Holland) was the sole UP gain in the election; nevertheless, Graaff took over leadership of the United Party in 1956 from J.G.N. Strauss. He led the opposition to the governments of three apartheid prime ministers, Johannes Strijdom, Hendrik Verwoerd, and B.J. Vorster.

He led the opposition to a republic in the 1960 referendum, and stated that South Africa's membership of the Commonwealth was under threat, and the declaration of a republic would lead to South Africa being isolated internationally.

In 1977, the United Party was dissolved and the New Republic Party was founded, of which Graaff briefly served as interim leader before retiring.  During his time as leader of the United Party it had split four times and been defeated in five general elections.

Legacy

The M1 highway, which was originally part of a ring road around the southern end of the Central Business District of Johannesburg to the affluent northern suburbs, was named the De Villiers Graaff Motorway in his honour.

References

External links

CricketArchive: De Villiers Graaff

Graaff, 2nd Baronet
South African cricketers
Western Province cricketers
Politicians from Cape Town
People from the Western Cape
1913 births
1999 deaths
Afrikaner people
United Party (South Africa) politicians
Members of the House of Assembly (South Africa)
Leaders of political parties
South African military personnel of World War II
World War II prisoners of war
de Villers
People from Cape Town
South African Officers of the Order of the British Empire
Anti-apartheid activists
South African anti-communists